

Systematics and morphology
Cynoscionicola is a genus which belongs to the family Microcotylidae and class Monogenea. Species of Cynoscionicola are ectoparasites that affect their host by attaching themselves as larvae on the gills of the fish and grow into adult stage. This larval stage is called oncomiracidium, and is characterized as free swimming and ciliated.
This genus was proposed by Price in 1962, to accommodate Cynoscionicola heteracantha and Cynoscionicola  pseudoheteracantha (previously included in the genus  Microcotyle).
Members of Cynoscionicola  are characterised by a genital atrium with two anterior muscular pockets armed with single row of hooked spines, and two posterior lateral muscular pouches armed with spines.

Species
According to the World Register of Marine Species, this genus includes 14 species:

References

Microcotylidae
Monogenea genera